In mathematics, the Eisenstein ideal is an ideal in the endomorphism ring of the Jacobian variety of a modular curve, consisting roughly of elements of the Hecke algebra of Hecke operators that annihilate the Eisenstein series. An Eisenstein prime is a prime in the support of the Eisenstein ideal (this has nothing to do with primes in the Eisenstein integers).

Definition

Let N be a rational prime, and define

J0(N) = J

as the Jacobian variety of the modular curve 

X0(N) = X.

There are endomorphisms Tl of J for each prime number l not dividing N. These come from the Hecke operator, considered first as an algebraic correspondence on X, and from there as acting on divisor classes, which gives the action on J. There is also a Fricke involution w (and Atkin–Lehner involutions if N is composite). The Eisenstein ideal, in the (unital) subring of End(J) generated as a ring by the  Tl, is generated as an ideal by the elements

 Tl − l - 1

for all l not dividing N, and by

w + 1.

Geometric definition

Suppose that T* is the ring generated by the Hecke operators acting on all modular forms for Γ0(N) (not just the cusp forms). The ring T of Hecke operators on the cusp forms is a quotient of T*, so Spec(T) can be viewed as a subscheme of Spec(T*). Similarly Spec(T*) contains a line (called the Eisenstein line) isomorphic to Spec(Z) coming from the action of Hecke operators on the Eisenstein series. The Eisenstein ideal is the ideal defining the intersection of the Eisenstein line with Spec(T) in Spec(T*).

Example

The Eisenstein ideal can also be defined for higher weight modular forms. Suppose that T is the full Hecke algebra generated by Hecke operators Tn acting on the 2-dimensional space of modular forms of level 1 and weight 12.This space is 2 dimensional, spanned by the Eigenforms given by the Eisenstein series E12 and the modular discriminant Δ. The map taking a Hecke operator Tn to its eigenvalues (σ11(n),τ(n)) gives a homomorphism from T into the ring Z×Z (where τ is the Ramanujan tau function and σ11(n) is the sum of the 11th powers of the divisors of n). The image is the set of pairs (c,d) with c and d  congruent mod 691 because of Ramanujan's congruence σ11(n) ≡ τ(n) mod 691. The Hecke algebra of Hecke operators acting on the cusp form  Δ is just isomorphic to Z. If we identify it with Z then the Eisenstein ideal is (691).

References

Modular forms
Abelian varieties